Ray or Raymond Hamilton may refer to:

 Ray Hamilton (born 1951), American football player
 Ray Hamilton (defensive end) (1916–1995), American football player
 Ray Hamilton (tight end) (born 1992), American football player
 Raymond Hamilton (1913–1935), American gangster
 Raymond Hamilton (soccer), American soccer player
 Raymond Hamilton (politician) (1909–1975), Australian politician

See also
Billy Ray Hamilton (died 2007), American murderer
Robert Ray Hamilton (1851–1890), American politician